Canelones may refer to:
Canelones, Uruguay, capital of its eponymous municipality and department
Municipality of Canelones
Canelones Department
Roman Catholic Diocese of Canelones, established in 1961